VIII Army Corps (VIII. Armeekorps) was a corps in the German Army during World War II. It was destroyed during the Battle of Stalingrad and reformed in mid-1943.

Commanders
 Cavalry General (General der Kavallerie) Paul Ludwig Ewald von Kleist, 21 May 1935 – 3 February 1938
 Infantry General (General der Infanterie) Ernst Busch, 3 February 1938 – 25 October 1939
 Colonel-General (Generaloberst) Walter Heitz, 25 October 1939 – 31 January 1943

After reformation

 Infantry General (General der Infanterie) Gustav Höhne, 20 July 1943 – 1 April 1944 
 Lieutenant General (Generalleutnant) Johannes Block, 1 April 1944 – 15 April 1944
 Lieutenant General (Generalleutnant) Hans Schlemmer, 15  April 1944 – 12 May 1944
 Infantry General (General der Infanterie) Gustav Höhne, 12 May 1944 – 10 September 1944  
 Artillery General (General der Artillerie) Walter Hartmann, 10 September 1944 - 19 March 1945
 Infantry General (General der Infanterie) Friedrich Wiese, 19 March 1945 - 20 April 1945
 Artillery General (General der Artillerie) Horst von Mellenthin, 20 April 1945 - 8 May 1945

Area of operations
Poland - September 1939 - May 1940 
France - May 1940 - June 1941 
Eastern Front, southern sector - June 1941 - October 1942  	
Stalingrad - October 1942 - January 1943	
Eastern Front,  - July 1943 - September 1944 	
Eastern Front, central sector - September 1944 - May 1945

See also
 List of German corps in World War II

External links

Army,08
Military units and formations established in 1934
1934 establishments in Germany
Military units and formations disestablished in 1945